Reflections may refer to:

Books and magazines
 Reflections; or Sentences and Moral Maxims, a series of books (1665–1678) by François de La Rochefoucauld
 Reflections (Sufi literature), by Idries Shah
 Reflections, an alumni publication of Lubbock Christian University
 Reflections, a publication of Yale Divinity School
 Reflections, an academic journal on writing and public rhetoric published by New City Community Press

Film and television

Film
 Reflections (1964 film) or Dry Summer, a Turkish film directed by Metin Erksan
 Reflections (1984 film), a British drama film directed by Kevin Billington
 Reflections (1987 film), a Yugoslavian psychological horror film directed by Goran Marković
 Reflections (1999 film), a British documentary film directed by Pogus Caesar
 Reflections (2005 film), an Indian short silent film by Bejoy Nambiar

Television
 Reflections (TV series), a 1962 Canadian classical-music television series
 "Reflections" (The Killing), a 2012 episode of the American television drama series The Killing
 "Reflections" (TMNT 2003), a 2004 episode of the cartoon program Teenage Mutant Ninja Turtles

Music
 Reflections Records, a Dutch record label

Bands 
 Reflections (Minnesota band), an American metalcore band formed in 2010
 The Reflections (Detroit band), a doo-wop group formed in the early 1960s
 The Reflections (Indianapolis band), a vocal group formed in the early 1960s
 The Reflections, a soul band from Harlem, New York also known for backing Melba Moore
 The Reflections, the Canadian backing band for Chad Allan, later known as The Guess Who
 Reflections, a solo project of Clint Newsom of the American band Rhythm of Black Lines

Albums
 Reflections (Steve Lacy album), 1959
 Reflections (Stan Getz album), 1964
 Reflections (Abdullah Ibrahim album), 1965
 Reflections (Terry Knight and the Pack album), 1967
 Reflections (The Supremes album), 1968
 Reflections (Manos Hatzidakis album), 1970
 Reflections (The 5th Dimension album), 1971
 Reflections (Jerry Garcia album), 1976
 Reflections (Andy Williams album), 1977
 Reflections (Chet Atkins and Doc Watson album), 1980
 Reflections (Akira Terao album), 1981
 Reflections, a 1981 album by Gil Scott-Heron
 Reflections (Rick James album), 1984
 Reflections (Hariharan album), 1988
 Reflections (1989 Frank Morgan album), 1989
 Reflections (Debby Boone album), 1989
 Reflections (The Judds album), 1994
 Reflections (Paul Young album), 1994
 Reflections (Bobo Stenson album), 1995
 Reflections (After 7 album), 1995
 Reflections (The Carpenters album), 1998
 Reflections (Apocalyptica album), 2003
 Reflections (B.B. King album), 2003
 Reflections (Paul van Dyk album), 2003
 Reflections (Miriam Makeba album), 2004
 Reflections (2006 Frank Morgan album), 2006
 Reflections (Sandra album), 2006
 Reflections (A Retrospective), a 2006 greatest hits album by Mary J. Blige
 Reflections (Graham Nash album), 2009
 Reflections (Kurt Rosenwinkel album), 2009
 Reflections (S.E.X. Appeal album),  2010
 Reflections (Candice Night album), 2011
 Reflections (EP), 2014 EP by MisterWives
 Reflections, a 2016 album by X-Panda
 Reflections (Hannah Diamond album), 2019

Songs
 "Reflections" (The Supremes song), 1967
 "Reflections" (Bliss n Eso song), 2010
 "Reflections" (MisterWives song), 2014
 "Reflections (Care Enough)", a 2001 single by Mariah Carey
 "Reflections", a song performed by Jody Miller

Other uses
 Reflection (mathematics), a transformation of a space
 Reflections (concert residency), a concert residency by Regine Velasquez in Manila
 Reflections (Amiga software), a 3D raytracing and modeling software
 Reflections (Dove), a 1935 painting by Arthur Dove
 Ubisoft Reflections, formerly Reflections Interactive, a games developer 
 Reflections, a 1942 radio program starring Frank Sinatra

See also
 
 
 Reflection (disambiguation)
 Reflexive (disambiguation)